The montane Sumatran white-bellied rat (Niviventer fraternus), also known as the Montane Sumatran niviventer, is a species of rodent in the family Muridae. It is found in the montane forests along the mountains of western Sumatra, Indonesia.

References

Rats of Asia
Niviventer
Endemic fauna of Indonesia
Fauna of Sumatra
Rodents of Indonesia
Mammals described in 1916